The SA8000 Standard is an auditable certification standard that encourages organizations to develop, maintain, and apply socially acceptable practices in the workplace. It was developed in 1989 by Social Accountability International, formerly the Council on Economic Priorities, by an advisory board consisting of trade unions, NGOs, civil society organizations and companies. The SA8000's criteria were developed from various industry and corporate codes to create a common standard for social welfare compliance. The current (2014) version of the standard is built on earlier 2001, 2004 and 2008 versions.

Certification 
SA8000 certification is a management systems standard, modeled on ISO standards. The criteria require that facilities seeking to gain and maintain certification must go beyond simple compliance to the standard. Prospective facilities must integrate it into their management practices and demonstrate ongoing compliance with the standard. SA8000 is based on the principles of international human rights norms as described in International Labour Organization conventions, the United Nations Convention on the Rights of the Child and the Universal Declaration of Human Rights. It measures the performance of companies in eight areas important to social accountability in the workplace: child labour, forced labour, health and safety, free association and collective bargaining, discrimination, disciplinary practices, working hours and compensation.

Performance criteria 
It also requires compliance with eight performance criteria, as outlined on the Social Accountability International website.
 Child Labor: No use or support of child labor; policies and written procedures for remediation of children found to be working in situation; provide adequate financial and other support to enable such children to attend school; and employment of young workers conditional.
 Forced and Compulsory Labor: No use or support for forced or compulsory labor; no required 'deposits' - financial or otherwise; no withholding salary, benefits, property or documents to force personnel to continue work; personnel right to leave premises after workday; personnel free to terminate their employment; and no use nor support for human trafficking.
 Health and Safety: Provide a safe and healthy workplace; prevent potential occupational accidents; appoint senior manager to ensure OSH; instruction on OSH for all personnel; system to detect, avoid, respond to risks; record all accidents; provide personal protection equipment and medical attention in event of work-related injury; remove, reduce risks to new and expectant mothers; hygiene- toilet, potable water, sanitary food storage; decent dormitories- clean, safe, meet basic needs; and worker right to remove from imminent danger.
 Freedom of Association and Right to Collective Bargaining: Respect the right to form and join trade unions and bargain collectively. All personnel are free to: organize trade unions of their choice; and bargain collectively with their employer. A company shall: respect right to organize unions & bargain collectively; not interfere in workers’ organizations or collective bargaining; inform personnel of these rights & freedom from retaliation; where law restricts rights, allow workers freely elect representatives; ensure no discrimination against personnel  engaged in worker organizations; and ensure representatives access to workers at the workplace.
 Discrimination: No discrimination based on race, national or social origin, caste, birth, religion, disability, gender, sexual orientation, union membership, political opinions and age.  No discrimination in hiring, remuneration, access to training, promotion, termination, and retirement. No interference with exercise of personnel tenets or practices; prohibition of threatening, abusive, exploitative, coercive behavior at workplace or company facilities; no pregnancy or virginity tests under any circumstances.
 Disciplinary Practices: Treat all personnel with dignity and respect; zero tolerance of corporal punishment, mental or physical abuse of personnel; no harsh or inhumane treatment. 
 Working Hours: Compliance with laws & industry standards; normal workweek, not including overtime, shall not exceed 48 hours; 1 day off following every 6 consecutive work days, with some exceptions; overtime is voluntary, not regular, not more than 12 hours per week; required overtime only if negotiated in CBA.
 Remuneration: Respect right of personnel to living wage; all workers paid at least legal minimum wage; wages sufficient to meet basic needs & provide discretionary income; deductions not for disciplinary purposes, with some exceptions; wages and benefits clearly communicated to workers; paid in convenient manner – cash or check form; overtime paid at premium rate; prohibited use of labor-only contracting, short-term contracts, false apprenticeship schemes to avoid legal obligations to personnel.

Certification is granted by independent certification bodies that are accredited and overseen by Social Accountability Accreditation Services (SAAS). There are 23 accredited certifications bodies worldwide. Statistics are reported quarterly and posted on the SAAS website. As of June 30, 2013, there were 3,231 certified facilities, employing a total of 1,862,936 workers, across 72 countries and 65 industrial sectors.

See also
2012 Pakistan factory fires, a certified plant that burned

References

External links 
 Official SAI/SA8000 website
 Social Accountability Accreditation Services
 Social Accountability International
 Social Audit Inspection Template Example

Standards
Working conditions